This article lists current and planned road building in the United Kingdom. Significant investment is expected, including plans for £14 billion of investment in road expansion by England's National Highways. In addition to physical expansion, smart motorways have been pursued as a means to increase capacity by introducing regular traffic on the hard shoulder. Transport is devolved, projects in Scotland, Wales, and Northern Ireland are delivered in co-operation with the devolved authorities of Transport Scotland, the Welsh Government, and Transport NI respectively.

New roads currently under construction 

 Inverness Trunk Road Link
 Silvertown Tunnel
 Stubbington bypass, expected to cost £34.5 million
 A585 Little Singleton bypass, expected to be completed in spring 2023 at a cost of £150 million
 A487 Caernarfon and Bontnewydd Bypass
 A120 Little Hadham bypass
Preston Western Distributor Road
Heyhouses Link Road
Gedling Access Road
Wichelstowe Southern Access
Grantham Southern Bypass
Etruria Valley Link Road
North Northallerton Link Road
Newtownards Movilla Road to Donaghadee Road and Bangor Road Link
Larne Distributor (South)
Ballyclare Western Relief Road

Proposed new roads 

 Lower Thames Crossing
 Stonehenge road tunnel
Longdendale Bypass
A £507 million contract to build the scheme was awarded in March 2021.
A new link road between the M54 and the M6, expected to be constructed between 2021–22 and 2024–25 at a cost of between £175 million and £200 million
 Shrewsbury North West Relief Road
A new route to parallel the existing A83, currently under consultations
A27 Arundel bypass
A46 Newark-on-Trent bypass, under planning, expected to cost between £400m and £500m
A5 Towcester bypass, expected to cost up to £38 million and be completed in 2023
Northampton North-West Relief Road, a  bypass
 A509 Isham bypass. Will start at Junction 9 A14 Kettering, bypassing Isham village reconnecting at Great Harrowden, reducing traffic between Kettering and Wellingborough.
Ashbourne bypass (a new 2.8 km road to the west of Ashbourne in Derbyshire)
Norwich Western Link route, a proposed new 3.8 mile dual carriageway road in Norfolk
A new  dual carriageway west of Elmstead Market linking the A120 and the A133. Planning application submitted in April 2021 with an expected cost of £70 million.
A5036 Port of Liverpool Access
A66 Dualling Temple Sowerby to Appleby
A66 Dualling Stephen Bank to Carkin Moor
A64 Hopgrove, under planning,

Expansion 

 Dualling of the A9 and the A96, planned for completion between 2026 and 2030 at a cost of £6 billion
 A9 Tomatin to Moy
 A66 Dualling: 
 Penrith to Temple Sowerby
 Appleby to Brough
 Bowes Bypass
 Cross Lanes to Rokeby
Dualling of 8 km (5 mi) of the A1 between Alnwick and Ellingham and 12.9 km (8 mi) between Morpeth and Felton, expected to be completed by 2024-25
Dualling of the A47 between North Tuddenham and Easton, expected to cost £100 million to £250 million, and between Blofield and North Burlingham at a cost of £50 million to £100 million.
An additional lane for both sides of the A1 between Birtley and Coal House, a  stretch. Approved in January 2021, Highways England stated the cost of this scheme was "yet to be determined".
Partial dualling of the A5, expected to start in 2024–25 at a cost of £20 million to £25 million
Capacity increase for three junctions along the A38 in Derby, expected to start in 2021 and be completed by 2024–25 at a cost of £200 million to £250 million. The Secretary of State approved the scheme's Development Consent Order on 8 January 2021 allowing the scheme to proceed
Expected to be completed in 2024–25 at a cost of £282 million.
Berryden corridor, a road-widening project in Aberdeen
Grade separation of the Sheriffhall roundabout on the Edinburgh City Bypass, expected to cost £120 million
Grade separation of Binley junction on the A46, expected to be completed in spring 2022 at a cost of £61.4 million
A465 Dowlais Top to Hirwaun
A1231 Dualling, Sunderland
A4440 Dualling, Worcester
A6 dualling - M22 to Castledawson 
A6 dualling - Dungiven to Londonderry,  under construction
M2 junction 5 (with the A249) capacity increase, started September 2021 and expected to end around Summer 2025 and cost £100 million
M621 junctions 1 to 7, capacity increase, Including extra lanes at J2.
A64 Askham Bryan Junction Improvement
M1/M62 Lofthouse Interchange

See also 

 Proposed British Isles fixed sea link connections
List of road protests in the UK and Ireland

References 

Projects
Proposed roads in the United Kingdom